Ryan Patrick Devlin (born June 5, 1980) is an American actor. He is known for hosting the initial seasons of Are You the One?, as well as his recurring roles in the television series Brothers & Sisters, Cougar Town, Veronica Mars, Big Shots, Jane the Virgin and Grey's Anatomy.

Filmography

References

External links

1979 births
American male film actors
American male television actors
American television personalities
Living people
Male actors from Lansing, Michigan
21st-century American male actors
Male actors from Grand Rapids, Michigan
Michigan State University alumni